Bethesda is a rapid transit station on the Red Line of the Washington Metro system in Bethesda, Maryland. It is one of the busiest suburban Metro stations, serving on average 9,142 passengers each weekday in 2017. The Purple Line, a light rail system currently under construction, will terminate at Bethesda, providing rail service to other inner Maryland suburbs such as Silver Spring and College Park, each of which has additional north-south connections by Washington Metro, and New Carrollton, which has Amtrak and MARC connections to both Washington, D.C. and Baltimore.

Location
Located at the center of the area's central business district, Bethesda station lies underneath Wisconsin Avenue at its intersection with Montgomery Avenue. In the direction of Shady Grove, it is the first station wholly within Montgomery County, as Friendship Heights straddles the border between Maryland and Washington, D.C.

Nearby landmarks
Bethesda-Chevy Chase High School
Capital Crescent Trail
Chevy Chase Bank headquarters
Consumer Product Safety Commission
Bethesda's Madonna of the Trail monument
Marriott International headquarters
Television stations WTTG and WDCA

History

The station opened on August 25, 1984.
In October 2013, a new staircase appeared between the mezzanine and platform.
In October 2014, the replacement of the first of three entrance escalators at the station began. The escalator site preparation, demolition, construction, installation and testing was projected to take approximately 42 weeks to complete. The $8.4 million project was completed on March 22, 2017.

The station's construction has been a major boon to the area, with several office buildings being built on (in the Bethesda Metro Center complex) and around it.

The Purple Line system is under construction as of 2022 and is scheduled to open in 2026.

Station layout 
Like the other 10 stations in the system constructed with rock tunneling, Bethesda station is deep underground.

The main escalators descending to the station are located on the west side of Wisconsin Avenue, adjacent to the station's underground bus bays. A Metro-style tunnel connects passengers to the southeast corner of Wisconsin and Old Georgetown Road. A mezzanine provides fare control and access to the station's island platform within the station.

Between January 17 and December 24, 2022, the Bethesda Plaza entrance escalator was replaced with stairs that lead from the bus station to street level. The escalator was replaced because a canopy could not be accommodated that would provide protection from the elements for a new escalator.

A new southern entrance will allow for connections to the Purple Line, which will be located in a tunnel running above the Red Line tunnel.

References

External links

WMATA: Bethesda Station
Old Georgetown Road entrance from Google Maps Street View

Bethesda, Maryland
Purple Line (Maryland)
Stations on the Red Line (Washington Metro)
Washington Metro stations in Maryland
Railway stations in the United States opened in 1984
Railway stations in Montgomery County, Maryland
Railway stations located underground in Maryland
1984 establishments in Maryland